Psychological projection is a defence mechanism of alterity concerning "inside" content mistaken to be coming from the "outside" Other. It forms the basis of empathy by the projection of personal experiences to understand someone else's subjective world. In its malignant forms, it is a defense mechanism in which the ego defends itself against disowned and highly negative parts of the self by denying their existence in themselves and attributing them to others, breeding misunderstanding and causing untold interpersonal damage. A bully may project their own feelings of vulnerability onto the target, or a person who is confused may project feelings of confusion and inadequacy onto other people. Projection incorporates blame shifting and can manifest as shame dumping. Projection has been described as an early phase of introjection.

Historical precursors
A prominent precursor in the formulation of the projection principle was Giambattista Vico. In 1841, Ludwig Feuerbach was the first enlightenment thinker to employ this concept as the basis for a systematic critique of religion.

The Babylonian Talmud (500 AD) notes the human tendency toward projection and warns against it: "Do not taunt your neighbour with the blemish you yourself have." Religious people of the Christian faith believe that in the New Testament, Jesus also warned against projection: "Why do you look at the speck of sawdust in your brother's eye and pay no attention to the plank in your own eye? How can you say to your brother, 'Let me take the speck out of your eye,' when all the time there is a plank in your own eye? You hypocrite, first take the plank out of your own eye, and then you will see clearly to remove the speck from your brother's eye."

Psychoanalytic developments
Projection was conceptualised by Sigmund Freud in his letters to Wilhelm Fliess, and further refined by Karl Abraham and Anna Freud. Freud considered that, in projection, thoughts, motivations, desires, and feelings that cannot be accepted as one's own are dealt with by being placed in the outside world and attributed to someone else. What the ego refuses to accept is split off and placed in another.

Freud would later come to believe that projection did not take place arbitrarily, but rather seized on and exaggerated an element that already existed on a small scale in the other person. (The related defence of projective identification differs from projection in that the other person is expected to become identified with the impulse or desire projected outside, so that the self maintains a connection with what is projected, in contrast to the total repudiation of projection proper.)

Melanie Klein saw the projection of good parts of the self as leading potentially to over-idealisation of the object. Equally, it may be one's conscience that is projected, in an attempt to escape its control: a more benign version of this allows one to come to terms with outside authority.

Theoretical examples 

Projection tends to come to the fore in normal people at times of personal or political crisis but is more commonly found in narcissistic personality disorder or borderline personality disorder.

Carl Jung considered that the unacceptable parts of the personality represented by the Shadow archetype were particularly likely to give rise to projection, both small-scale and on a national/international basis. Marie-Louise Von Franz extended her view of projection, stating that "wherever known reality stops, where we touch the unknown, there we project an archetypal image".

Psychological projection is one of the medical explanations of bewitchment used to explain the behavior of the afflicted children at Salem in 1692. The historian John Demos wrote in 1970 that the symptoms of bewitchment displayed by the afflicted girls could have been due to the girls undergoing psychological projection of repressed aggression.

Practical examples 

Victim blaming: The victim of someone else's actions or bad luck may be offered criticism, the theory being that the victim may be at fault for having attracted the other person's hostility. In such cases, the psyche projects the experiences of weakness or vulnerability with the aim of ridding itself of the feelings and, through its disdain for them or the act of blaming, their conflict with the ego.
Projection of marital guilt: Thoughts of infidelity to a partner may be unconsciously projected in self-defence on to the partner in question, so that the guilt attached to the thoughts can be repudiated or turned to blame instead, in a process linked to denial. For example, a person who is having a sexual affair may fear that their spouse is planning an affair or may accuse the innocent spouse of adultery.
Bullying: A bully may project their own feelings of vulnerability onto the target(s) of the bullying activity. Despite the fact that a bully's typically denigrating activities are aimed at the bully's targets, the true source of such negativity is ultimately almost always found in the bully's own sense of personal insecurity or vulnerability. Such aggressive projections of displaced negative emotions can occur anywhere from the micro-level of interpersonal relationships, all the way up to the macro-level of international politics, or even international armed conflict.
 People in love "reading" each other's mind involves a projection of the self into the other.
Projection of general guilt: Projection of a severe conscience is another form of defense, one which may be linked to the making of false accusations, personal or political.
Projection of hope: Also, in a more positive light, a patient may sometimes project their feelings of hope onto the therapist.

Counter-projection 

Jung wrote, "All projections provoke counter-projection when the object is unconscious of the quality projected upon it by the subject." Thus, what is unconscious in the recipient will be projected back onto the projector, precipitating a form of mutual acting out.

In a rather different usage, Harry Stack Sullivan saw counter-projection in the therapeutic context as a way of warding off the compulsive re-enactment of a psychological trauma, by emphasizing the difference between the current situation and the projected obsession with the perceived perpetrator of the original trauma.

Clinical approaches 

Drawing on Gordon Allport's idea of the expression of self onto activities and objects, projective techniques have been devised to aid personality assessment, including the Rorschach ink-blots and the Thematic Apperception Test (TAT).

Projection may help a fragile ego reduce anxiety, but at the cost of a certain dissociation, as in dissociative identity disorder. In extreme cases, an individual's personality may end up becoming critically depleted. In such cases, therapy may be required which would include the slow rebuilding of the personality through the "taking back" of such projections.

The method of managed projection is a projective technique. The basic principle of this method is that a subject is presented with their own verbal portrait named by the name of another person, as well as with a portrait of their fictional opposition (V. V. Stolin, 1981).

The technique is suitable for application in psychological counseling and might provide valuable information about the form and nature of their self-esteem

Criticism 

Some studies were critical of Freud's theory. Research on social projection supports the existence of a false-consensus effect whereby humans have a broad tendency to believe that others are similar to themselves, and thus "project" their personal traits onto others. This applies to both good and bad traits; it is not a defense mechanism for denying the existence of the trait within the self.  A study of the empirical evidence for a range of defense mechanisms by Baumeister, Dale, and Sommer (1998) concluded, "The view that people defensively project specific bad traits of their own onto others as a means of denying that they have them is not well supported."   However, Newman, Duff, and Baumeister (1997) proposed a new model of defensive projection in which the repressor's efforts to suppress thoughts of their undesirable traits make those trait categories highly accessible—so that they are then used all the more often when forming impressions of others. The projection is then only a byproduct of the real defensive mechanism.

See also

References 

Defence mechanisms
Borderline personality disorder
Narcissism
Bullying
Cognitive biases
Psychoanalytic terminology
Freudian psychology
Paranoia